Khel are sub-tribes of Pashtun tribes in Afghanistan and Pakistan. The title of the tribe ends in Zai and its sub-tribe name ends in Khel. Khel is also a common final element in the names of villages in Afghanistan and in the Khyber Pakhtunkhwa of Pakistan, such as Darra Adam Khel.

Some of the clans of Pashtun tribes:
 Daulat Khel
 Ghoryakhel
 Isakhel (sub-tribe)
 Khan Khel
 Khizar Khel
 Khwaja Khel
 Maghdud Khel
 Mahmud Khel
 Musakhel
 Sahib Khel
 Umar Khel
 Utmankhel

See also                
 Zai (tribe)
 Pashtun people

References

Pashtun tribes
Pashto words and phrases